Vaadjuv Dag Nyqvist (October 5, 1902 – 9 May 1961) was a Norwegian sailor who competed in the 1936 Summer Olympics.

In 1936 he won the silver medal as crew member of the Norwegian boat Lully II in the 6 metre class event.

External links
profile

1902 births
1961 deaths
Norwegian male sailors (sport)
Olympic sailors of Norway
Sailors at the 1936 Summer Olympics – 6 Metre
Olympic silver medalists for Norway
Olympic medalists in sailing

Medalists at the 1936 Summer Olympics